The Girl Who Came Gift-Wrapped is a 1974 American made-for-television comedy film starring Karen Valentine, Richard Long, Tom Bosley and Farrah Fawcett. It was directed by Bruce Bilson and aired as the ABC Movie of the Week on January 29, 1974.

Plot
A young girl is sent as a present to the publisher of a men's magazine.

Cast
Karen Valentine as Sandy Brown / Sandy Benson
Richard Long as Michael Green
Tom Bosley as Harold
Farrah Fawcett as Patti
Dave Madden as Stanley

Reception
"Should have been returned to sender", wrote the Los Angeles Times. Ratings were described as "subpar".

References

External links

 The Girl Who Came Gift-Wrapped on TCM

1974 television films
1974 films
1974 comedy films
American comedy television films
ABC Movie of the Week
Films directed by Bruce Bilson
Films produced by Aaron Spelling
Films scored by Jack Elliott
1970s American films